The Tramway Stakes, registered as the Tramway Handicap, is a City Tattersalls Club Group 2 Thoroughbred  horse race for horses three years old and older run with set weights and penalties, over a distance of 1400 metres at Randwick Racecourse, Sydney, Australia in September. Total prizemoney for the race is A$250,000.

History

Grade
 1886–1978 - Principal Race 
 1979–1983 - Listed Race
 1984–1983 - Group 3
 2014 onwards - Group 2

Venue
 1984–1999 - Randwick
 2000 - Rosehill  
 2001–2003 - Randwick
 2004 - Warwick Farm
 2005–2010 - Randwick
 2011–2012 - Warwick Farm
 2013 onwards - Randwick

Distance
 1886–1971 - 7 furlongs (~1400 metres)
 1972–1999 – 1400 metres
 2000 – 1350 metres
 2001 – 1300 metres
 2002 onwards - 1400 metres

1926 & 1945 Racebooks

Winners

 2022 - Zaaki
 2021 - Zaaki
 2020 - Dreamforce
 2019 - Dreamforce
 2018 - Comin' Through 
 2017 - Happy Clapper 
 2016 - Hauraki 
 2015 - Hooked 
 2014 - Lucia Valentina
 2013 - Malavio
 2012 - Tagus
 2011 - Sincero
 2010 - Neeson
 2009 - Rangirangdoo
 2008 - Bank Robber
 2007 - ♯race not held
 2006 - Primus
 2005 - Shania Dane
 2004 - Nips
 2003 - Sportsman
 2002 - Gordo
 2001 - Diamond Dane
 2000 - Mr. Innocent
 1999 - Kinzaffra
 1998 - Corporate James
 1997 - Galactic Valley
 1996 - Peruzzi
 1995 - Rembetica
 1994 - Big Dreams
 1993 - Ghost Story
 1992 - Cobbora
 1991 - Moville Peter
 1990 - Shaftesbury Avenue
 1989 - Cole Diesel
 1988 - Gold Trump
 1987 - Wong
 1986 - Chanteclair
 1985 - Double Dandy
 1984 - Tandrio
 1983 - Secret Romance
 1982 - Tuna Too
 1981 - Winter's Dance
 1980 - Tullmax 
 1979 - Imposing
 1978 - Bernard
 1977 - Party's Pride
 1976 - Hamden
 1975 - Summer Fantasy
 1974 - Navaho Brave
 1973 - Big Circle
 1972 - Charlton Boy
 1971 - Cast Iron
 1970 - Bermudez
 1969 - Black Onyx
 1968 - Royal Rene
 1967 - Shakedown
 1966 - Autumn Boy
 1965 - Uriel
 1964 - Farnworth
 1963 - King Brian
 1962 - Bogan Road
 1961 - Wenona Girl
 1960 - Grenoble
 1959 - Grenoble
 1958 - Amanullah
 1957 - Landy
 1956 - Teranyan
 1955 - Compound
 1954 - Bronze Peak
 1953 - Spearby
 1952 - High Law
 1951 - French Cavalier
 1950 - Humming Top
 1949 - Buzmark
 1948 - De La Salle
 1947 - Clipper
 1946 - Puffham
 1945 - Shannon
 1944 - Prince
 1943 - Dewar
 1942 - Gundagai
 1941 - Evergreen
 1940 - Tel Asur
 1939 - Adios
 1938 - Mohican
 1937 - Lough Neagh
 1936 - The Marne
 1935 - Lough Neagh
 1934 - Roman Spear
 1933 - Turbine
 1932 - ‡Sir Duninald 
 1932 - †‡Rogilla/Chatham
 1931 - ‡Waugoola 
 1931 - ‡Pentheus
 1930 - Killarney
 1929 - Ceremony
 1928 - Amounis
 1927 - Mullabawn
 1926 - Fujisan
 1925 - Irish Prince
 1924 - Julia Grey
 1923 - Vaccine
 1922 - Rostrum
 1921 - Beauford
 1920 - Remmon
 1919 - Wolaroi
 1918 - Panacre
 1917 - Ardrossan
 1916 - Polycrates
 1915 - First Principle
 1914 - Royal Laddie
 1913 - Gigandra
 1912 - Gigandra
 1911 - Grist
 1910 - Malt King
 1909 - Parsee
 1908 - Melodrama
 1907 - Legation
 1906 - Pompous
 1905 - Machine Gun
 1904 - Mimer
 1903 - Marvel Loch
 1902 - Baccarat
 1901 - Ruskin
 1900 - Bange
 1899 - Felicity
 1898 - The Tola
 1897 - Blue Vest
 1896 - Amiable
 1895 - Blue Cap
 1894 - Wakawatea
 1893 - Lullaby
 1892 - Victor Hugo
 1891 - Bedtime
 1890 - Paddy
 1889 - Merriment
 1888 - Lady Marion
 1887 - Glen Elgin
 1886 - Burrilda
 

† Dead heat
‡ Run in Divisions
♯ Not held because of outbreak of equine influenza

See also
 List of Australian Group races
 Group races

References

Horse races in Australia